A hinged expansion joint is a metallic assembly, that can rotate in a single plane, used to absorb changes resulting from piping thermal expansion or contraction. They include hinges, attached to the expansion joint ends with a pair of pins, which allow angular movement in a single plane, restrain the pressure thrust, and prevent the expansion joint from deflecting axially, either in extension or compression. It is recommended that the hinges should be used in sets of two or three. The expansion joint hinges provide for angular movement and will resist pressure thrust forces.

Individual hinged expansion joints used in piping systems are restricted to pure angular rotation by its hinges. As a pair, hinged expansion joints will function together to absorb lateral deflection. Advantages of hinged expansion joints are that they are typically compact in size and structurally rigid.

Applications 
 Air, Steam, & Flue Gas Ducts
 Power Plants
 Chemical Industry
 Gas Turbine System
 Petrochemical Industry
 Primary reformer ducts & burners
 Steel Plants

References

External links 
 U.S. Bellows, Inc. http://www.usbellows.com
 American Society for Testing and Materials (ASTM) http://www.astm.org/
 Expansion Joint Manufacturers Association EJMA http://www.ejma.org

Structural connectors